TV Choice is a British weekly TV listings magazine published by H. Bauer Publishing, the UK subsidiary of family-run German company Bauer Media Group. It features weekly TV broadcast programming listings, running from Saturday to Friday, and goes on sale every Tuesday. A double issue is released to cover the Christmas & New Year period at a higher price.

Overview

Regular issues
Launched on 14 September 1999, the magazine includes features on UK TV shows, including the British soap operas, and films, as well as puzzles, crosswords, a letters page and prize competitions.

Prices
The following prices have been effective.

Christmas and New Year issues
A special Christmas & New Year double-issue was originally priced at £1, double the normal price. As of December 2021, the seasonal issue is priced at £1.50, twice the price of the regular 72p weekly issues. It was revealed on 29 November 2022, that the 2022 seasonal issue would be released on 13 December, making it the first ever issue to be published in such a late date in December.

Podcast
In February 2022, it was announced that TV Choice would release its first ever podcast entitled My TV Years, with television presenter and radio DJ Mel Giedroyc hosting. The podcast ran for eight weeks, on a Wednesday, with the first airing 23 February 2022, and the final episode on 13 April 2022.

Episodes

Circulation
In February 2008, TV Choice became the biggest selling (actively purchased) magazine of all categories in the UK, a position it has held ever since. It sells over 1.2 million copies a week and has an adult readership of 1.8 million. It has a target market among C1 C2 young, mass market adults.

Awards

TV Choice also has its own annual awards ceremony, the TV Choice Awards originally called the TV Quick Award, awarded on the basis of a public vote by readers of TV Choice. The following categories and winners are shown from the 2009 awards to the present day.
{| class="wikitable sortable"
|-
! Category !! Winners
|-
| Best Reality Show 
| The ApprenticeI'm a Celebrity...Get Me Out of Here!
|-
| Best Actor 
| Philip GlenisterJack O'ConnellDavid TennantBenedict CumberbatchTom HiddlestonCillian MurphyAdrian Dunbarand more
|-
| Best Game Show 
| Deal or No DealTotal WipeoutThe Cubeand more
|-
| Best Talent Show
| Britain's Got TalentThe Great British Bake OffStrictly Come Dancingand more 
|-
| Best Comedy Show
| The InbetweenersGavin & StaceyMrs Brown's BoysBenidormBirds of a FeatherPeter Kay's Car ShareAfter Lifeand more
|-
| Best Soap Actress
| Katherine KellyMichelle KeeganAlison KingLacey TurnerJessie WallaceLindsay CoulsonCharlotte BellamyEmma Atkinsand more
|-
| Best Daytime Show
| Loose WomenThe Jeremy Kyle ShowThis MorningThe Chase
|-
| Best Soap Actor
| Simon GregsonDanny MillerShane RichieDanny DyerRyan Hawleyand more 
|-
| Best Entertainment Show
| Ant & Dec's Saturday Night TakeawayAlan Carr: Chatty ManCelebrity JuiceThe Graham Norton Show
|-
| Best Soap Newcomer: Actresses 
| Lauren CracePaula LaneKirsty-Leigh PorterSally DexterKara-Leah Fernandes
|-
| Best Soap Newcomer: Actors 
| Adam ThomasTony DisciplineDavid WittsDavood GhadamiShayne WardNed Porteous
|-
| Outstanding Contribution
| Ant & DecCoronation StreetEmmerdaleDoctor WhoEastEndersBarbara WindsorMary Berry
|-
| Best Soap Storyline
| Danielle and Ronnie's Story in EastEndersAaron's gay self-loathing in EmmerdaleHayley Cropper's Cancer, Coronation Street
|-
| Best Family Drama
| Waterloo RoadDoctor WhoCall the Midwife
|-
| Best Soap 
| EastEndersCoronation StreetEmmerdale
|-
| Best Drama Series
| Ashes to AshesBeing HumanSherlockDoctor WhoBroadchurchDownton Abbey
|-
| Best New Drama
| MerlinGleeSherlockCall the MidwifeBroadchurchHappy ValleyPoldarkDoctor FosterLittle Boy BlueLiarBodyguard
|-
| Best Actress
| Sheridan SmithSarah LancashireOlivia ColmanMichelle KeeganJodie Comer
|-
| Soap Moment of the Year
| Coronation Street'''s 50th Anniversary Tram Crash sceneEmmerdale Live Episode
|-
| Best International Show
| The Big Bang TheoryGame of Thrones|-
| Best Food Show
| Gordon Ramsay's F WordJamie's 30 Minute MealsThe Hairy Bikers' BakeationJamie's 15-Minute MealsGordon Ramsay's Home CookingSaturday KitchenSunday BrunchGino's Italian Escape: Hidden ItalyGordon, Gino and Fred: Road Trip|-
| Best Factual Entertainment & Lifestyle Show
| Top GearCome Dine with MeSupersize vs. SuperskinnyPaul O'Grady: For the Love of DogsEducating YorkshireGoggleboxDIY SOS: The Big BuildBlue Planet II|}

References

External links
 TV Choice TV Choice'' Magazine (Official website)
 TV Choice Bauer UK (facts and ratecard)

1999 establishments in the United Kingdom
Television magazines published in the United Kingdom
Weekly magazines published in the United Kingdom
Listings magazines
Magazines established in 1999
Bauer Group (UK)
British television awards
Magazines published in London